Lathyrus biflorus is a rare species of wild pea known by the common name twoflower pea. It is endemic to Humboldt County, California, where it is known only from the Mount Lassic Wilderness. It is a member of the serpentine soils flora. This is a petite perennial herb growing thin, tough, fuzzy stems with leaves each made up of two pairs of small linear leaflets. There are tiny bristlelike tendrils. The inflorescence bears two greenish-white pea flowers each up to a centimeter wide. The fruit is a hairless dehiscent legume pod.

Further reading

References

External links
Jepson Manual Treatment
USDA Plants Profile
Photo gallery
Plant Profile and Photo

biflorus
Endemic flora of California
Natural history of the California Coast Ranges
Natural history of Humboldt County, California
Plants described in 1983
Critically endangered flora of California